A figure of merit (FOM) is a quantity used to characterize the performance of a device, system or method, relative to its alternatives.

Examples
Accuracy of a rifle
Audio amplifier figures of merit such as gain or efficiency
Battery life of a laptop computer
Calories per serving
Clock rate of a CPU is often given as a figure of merit, but is of limited use in comparing between different architectures. FLOPS may be a better figure, though these too aren't completely representative of the performance of a CPU.
Contrast ratio of an LCD
Frequency response of a speaker
Fill factor of a solar cell
Resolution of the image sensor in a digital camera
Measure of the detection performance of a sonar system, defined as the propagation loss for which a 50% detection probability is achieved
Noise figure of a radio receiver
The thermoelectric figure of merit, zT, a material constant proportional to the efficiency of a thermoelectric couple made with the material
The figure of merit of digital-to-analog converter, calculated as (power dissipation)/(2ENOB × effective bandwidth) [J/Hz]
Luminous efficacy of lighting
Profit of a company
Residual noise remaining after compensation in an aeromagnetic survey
Heat absorption and transfer quality for a solar cooker

Benchmarks are synthetic figures of merit that summarize the speed of computers in performing various typical tasks.

See also

Performance metric

References

Engineering ratios